Fahrenhaidt is a German band, with the main composers, producers, and band members being Erik Macholl and Andreas John. Its music is described as "modern nature-Pop".

Career

On 29 January 2015, they released their first single in collaboration with the Danish singer Amanda Pedersen, titled "Frozen Silence". A week later, on 6 February, they released their first album, The Book of Nature. The songs were performed by other artists, such as the German-Canadian-English singer Alice Merton and the Eurovision 2013 winner Emmelie de Forest.

Fahrenhaidt participated as contestants to represent Germany in the Eurovision Song Contest 2015 in Vienna, Austria. They had previously produced the song "Disappear" for Germany in the Eurovision Song Contest 2008. The two songs they chose were "Frozen Silence" and "Mother Earth". They were eliminated in the first round.

A second single, "Lights Will Guide Me", was used for the web campaign of the online game Echo of Soul.

Discography

Albums

References

New-age music groups
German pop music groups